Roll'd is an Australian-based fast food chain which specialises in a range of traditional Vietnamese cuisine dishes, including Bánh mì, Pho, and rice paper rolls, which are marketed as Soldiers. The first store was opened by founders Bao Hoang, Ray Esquires, and Tin Ly in Melbourne's CBD in 2012, quickly expanding to over 50 stores by 2016.

In 2021, Roll'd announced a partnership with supermarket chain Coles to bring ready-made grab & go meals and a range of other popular items to store shelves across Australia.

See also
 List of restaurant chains in Australia

References 

Fast-food franchises
Fast-food chains of Australia
Australian companies established in 2012
Restaurants established in 2012
2012 establishments in Australia
Privately held companies of Australia
Vietnamese restaurants
Asian restaurants in Australia